Paul Lennart James Simonsson (born 16 February 1967) is a New Zealand former rugby union and rugby league player. A wing, Simonsson represented Waikato and Wellington in rugby union at a provincial level, and was a member of the New Zealand national side, the All Blacks, on their 1987 tour of Japan. He played two matches for the All Blacks, scoring seven tries, but did not play any test matches.

Simonsson switched codes to rugby league in 1990, but his career was curtailed by injury. He played only three NSWRL matches, two from the bench, for North Sydney Bears in 1991 and 1992. He subsequently returned to rugby union in 1995, and played for New South Wales and the Australian Sevens team in 1996 before injury forced his retirement.

Simonsson worked as a police detective in New South Wales, having first joined the New Zealand Police in 1987. He was later a tax investigator for the Australian Taxation Office and worked at the Australian Department of Climate Change. He is currently the head of intelligence at the Australian Sports Anti-Doping Authority.

References

1967 births
Living people
Australian police officers
Male rugby sevens players
New South Wales Waratahs players
New Zealand emigrants to Australia
New Zealand international rugby union players
New Zealand rugby league players
New Zealand rugby union players
North Sydney Bears players
People educated at Tauranga Boys' College
Rugby league players from Tauranga
Rugby league wingers
Rugby union players from Tauranga
Rugby union wings
Waikato rugby union players
Wellington rugby union players